Kara Hope is a Democratic member of the Michigan House of Representatives.

Before being elected to the state legislature, she served as an Ingham County Commissioner from 2013 to 2018. Prior to that she worked as a defense attorney and as an adjunct professor at her alma mater Cooley Law School. She also wrote for the Ionia Daily News.

References

External links 
 Kara Hope at housedems.com

Living people
Democratic Party members of the Michigan House of Representatives
Michigan lawyers
Michigan State University alumni
Western Michigan University Cooley Law School alumni
21st-century American women politicians
21st-century American politicians
Women state legislators in Michigan
Year of birth missing (living people)